Farmers Mercantile Co. Building is a historic commercial building located at High Hill, Montgomery County, Missouri.  It was built in 1904, and is two-story, frame building.  It rests on a stone foundation and has a low-pitched gable roof behind a stepped parapet.  The building historically served as a social and commercial center for the community.

It was listed on the National Register of Historic Places in 2004.

References

Commercial buildings on the National Register of Historic Places in Missouri
Commercial buildings completed in 1904
Buildings and structures in Montgomery County, Missouri
National Register of Historic Places in Montgomery County, Missouri